PGAS may refer to:

 Partitioned global address space, a parallel programming model in computer science
 Provisional Government of Autonomous Siberia, an ephemeral government in Siberia in 1918
 Pertamina Gas Negara, Indonesia Stock Exchange symbol PGAS
 Pegatron Corporation, Luxembourg Stock Exchange symbol PGAS
 Polyglandular autoimmune syndrome, or autoimmune polyendocrine syndrome

See also 
 PGA (disambiguation)